Sobekhotep was an ancient Egyptian treasurer in office under king Senusret I, around 1950 BC. The treasurer was one of the leading officials at the royal court, responsible for supplying the palace with all kinds of goods. Sobekhotep is only attested in a rock inscription in Hatnub in Middle Egypt where alabaster was quarried. The inscription dates to year 22 of the reign of Senusret I. Next to title treasurer, Sobekhotep bears the titles royal sealer and sole friend. His successor in office was perhaps Mentuhotep.

References 

Ancient Egyptian treasurers
Officials of the Twelfth Dynasty of Egypt
Ancient Egyptian royal sealers